Saraswati Shishu Vidya Mandir, Dhurwa is a co-educational English medium school affiliated to the Central Board of Secondary Education, Delhi and is situated at Dhurwa of Heavy Engineering Corporation township, Ranchi. It is managed by Shishu Vikas Mandir Samiti (Jharkhand), Dhurwa, Ranchi, A registered body under the India Societies Registration Act of 1960. Saraswati Shishu Mandir (Dhurwa, Ranchi, Jharkhand) was started in the year 1972 and later on was upgraded as Saraswati Vidya Mandir in the session 1977–1978. School is run on the education system of Vidya Bharati, and its Jharkhand state chapter Vananchal Shiksha Samiti and the school trust's name is "Shishu Vikas Mandir Samiti (Jharkhand), Dhurwa, Ranchi".

The institution's primary aim and function is to impart education to the wards of employees of Heavy Engineering Corporation, Hatia, Ranchi. Others may also be admitted depending upon the availability of seats.

The school imparts education from nursery classes up to seniors secondary Level. Near about 2500 students study here. The school is affiliated to the Central Board of Secondary Education.

Location and campus 
The school is located at Dhurwa 4 km away from Hatia Railway Station and 12 km from Ranchi Railway Station.  The route passes through Birsa Chauk and Jharkhand Vidhan Sabha.  The school is located in the pollution free environment surrounded by evergreen trees on the lap of Jagannath temple and by the side of stadium. Twice the students of SVM dDhurwa performed 100% first division result (1984 and 1991). At that time S.V.M. was affiliated by B.S.S.E.B, Patna. Some of the teachers were Radhesyam Guruji, Uday Narayan Dwivedi, Sacchidanand Pandey, Shiv Guruji, Kamlakant Guruji, Bharmhdeo Mandal Guruji, Pramod Guruji (Hindi), Vinod Kumar Singh Guruji, and Bihuti Narayan Pandey.

The school compound is divided into academic blocks and departments as SVM, SSVM, Madhav Library, Reading Hall, Keshav Sabhagar, Aryabhatt Science Building and Sandipni Ashram (hostel).

See also 
Education in India
Saraswati Vidya Mandir (disambiguation)
Saraswati Shishu Mandir
Kailash Roy Saraswati Vidya Mandir, Jhumri Telaiya
Central Board of Secondary Education

References

External links

Private schools in Jharkhand
Vidya Bharati schools